The Arenteiro is a river in Galicia, in Spain.

See also
 Rivers of Galicia

Rivers of Spain
Rivers of Galicia (Spain)